Statistics of Qatar Stars League for the 1970–71 season.

Overview
Al-Oruba won the championship.

References
Qatar - List of final tables (RSSSF)

Qatar
1970–71 in Qatari football